Southland District is a territorial authority district in New Zealand that covers the south of the South Island as well as Stewart Island/Rakiura.

History
Southland District was formed through the 1989 local government reforms. Four local authorities were amalgamated at that time: Wallace County, Winton Borough, Stewart Island County and most of Southland County. John Casey, who was first elected onto Southland County Council in 1977, oversaw the amalgamation and was elected Southland District's first mayor in 1989.

Winton Wallacetown Ward was renamed Oreti Ward with effect from the Council election on 12 October 2019. The Oreti River flows through this ward.

Geography

Southland District covers the majority of the land area of Southland Region, although the region also covers Gore District, Invercargill City and adjacent territorial waters. It has a land area of 29,574.53 km2, excluding inland waters such as Lake Te Anau, Lake Manapouri, and Lake Hauroko.

Southland District contains the islands south of Foveaux Strait:

Solander Islands
Stewart Island/Rakiura
Ruapuke Island

The seat of the District Council is Invercargill, which, however, is not part of Southland District, but a territorial authority in its own right.

Two of New Zealand's largest national parks are within the boundaries of Southland District: Fiordland National Park, and Rakiura National Park (which covers most of Stewart Island/Rakiura).

Urban areas and settlements
The Southland District has three towns with a population over 1,000. Together they are home to % of the district's population.

Other settlements and localities in the district include:

Mararoa Waimea Ward

 Five Rivers Area:
 Athol
 Castlerock
 Eyre Creek
 Fairlight
 Five Rivers
 Garston
 Josephville
 Lowther
 Lumsden
 Mossburn
 Nokomai
 Parawa
 Saint Patricks
 
 Te Anau Area:
 Cascade Creek
 Knobs Flat
 Manapouri
 Milford Sound
 Te Anau
 The Key

 Waikaia Area:
 Ardlussa
 Balfour
 Kauhoe
 Riversdale
 Waikaia
 Wendon
 Wendonside

Waiau Aparima Ward

 Riverton Area:
 Colac Bay
 Gummies Bush
 Orepuki
 Pahia
 Riverton/Aparima
 Thornbury
 Waipango

 Tuatapere Area:
 Blackmount
 Clifden
 Merrivale
 Monowai
 Papatotara
 Piko Piko
 Pukemaori
 Te Tua
 Te Waewae
 Tuatapere

 Wallace Area:
 Drummond
 Fairfax
 Isla Bank
 Nightcaps
 Ohai
 Otahuti
 Otautau
 Wairio
 Wreys Bush

Waihopai Toetoe Ward

 Toetoes Area:
 Curio Bay
 Fortification
 Fortrose
 Glenham
 Haldane
 Mokoreta
 Niagara
 Otara
 Pine Bush
 Pukewao
 Quarry Hills
 Redan
 Slope Point
 Titiroa
 Te Peka
 Tokanui
 Waipapa Point
 Waikawa
 Waimahaka
 Wyndham

 Waihopai Area:
 Ashers
 Dacre
 Gorge Road
 Grove Bush
 Kapuka
 Kapuka South
 Longbush
 Mabel Bush
 Mokotua
 Oteramika
 Rakahouka
 Rimu
 Roslyn Bush
 Timpanys
 Woodlands

 Te Tipua Area:
 Brydone
 Edendale
 Glencoe
 Menzies Ferry
 Morton Mains
 Ota Creek
 Seaward Downs
 Te Tipua
 Waitane

Oreti Ward

 Wallacetown Area:
 Branxholme
 Lochiel
 Makarewa
 Ryal Bush
 Spar Bush
 Tussock Creek
 Waianiwa
 Wallacetown
 Waimatuku

 Winton Area:
 Benmore
 Browns
 Caroline
 Centre Bush
 Dipton
 Dipton West
 Hedgehope
 Kauana
 Lady Barkly
 Limehills
 Oreti Plains
 Otapiri
 South Hillend
 Springhills
 Winton

Stewart Island-Rakiura Ward
Oban
Port Pegasus (uninhabited)
Port William (uninhabited)

Demographics

Southland District had a population of 30,864 at the 2018 New Zealand census, an increase of 1,251 people (4.2%) since the 2013 census, and an increase of 2,427 people (8.5%) since the 2006 census. There were 11,982 households. There were 16,029 males and 14,835 females, giving a sex ratio of 1.08 males per female. The median age was 39.1 years (compared with 37.4 years nationally), with 6,534 people (21.2%) aged under 15 years, 5,262 (17.0%) aged 15 to 29, 14,436 (46.8%) aged 30 to 64, and 4,635 (15.0%) aged 65 or older.

Ethnicities were 88.1% European/Pākehā, 11.1% Māori, 1.1% Pacific peoples, 6.2% Asian, and 2.3% other ethnicities. People may identify with more than one ethnicity.

The percentage of people born overseas was 13.6, compared with 27.1% nationally.

Although some people objected to giving their religion, 51.7% had no religion, 38.4% were Christian, 0.5% were Hindu, 0.2% were Muslim, 0.3% were Buddhist and 1.7% had other religions.

Of those at least 15 years old, 3,363 (13.8%) people had a bachelor or higher degree, and 5,739 (23.6%) people had no formal qualifications. The median income was $36,300, compared with $31,800 nationally. 3,732 people (15.3%) earned over $70,000 compared to 17.2% nationally. The employment status of those at least 15 was that 13,956 (57.4%) people were employed full-time, 4,053 (16.7%) were part-time, and 519 (2.1%) were unemployed.

Government

Mayor

The current district mayor is Rob Scott. He has held this position since 2022.

Council
The district council is made up of twelve elected members, from various ward areas, and like any other local authority is elected every three years.

Sister cities

Current sister city
 Cinque Terre, La Spezia, Liguria

Former sister city
 Wyong Shire, New South Wales

Southland District was a sister city to Wyong Shire in New South Wales, Australia until 2010.

See also
List of historic places in Southland District

References

External links

 Southland District Council official website